Majuhan is a village in Abbottabad District of Khyber-Pakhtunkhwa province of Pakistan. Until the local government reforms of 2000 it was a Union Council, an administrative subdivision of the district, currently it is part of Nambal Union Council.

Location 
Marjuan is located in west of Abbottabad District, and lies near to the borders of Kashmir

References

Populated places in Abbottabad District